Guy I of Châtillon, Count of Blois (died 12 August 1342), son of Hugh II of Châtillon and Beatrix of Dampierre, was Count of Blois and Lord of Avesnes 1307–1342.

In 1310, he married Margaret of Valois, daughter of Charles of Valois and sister of Philip VI of France.  They had three children:
Louis II, Count of Blois (d. 1346)
Charles of Blois (d. 1364) - would marry Joanna, Duchess of Brittany; Charles and the French would engage in the Breton War of Succession against the House of Montfort and the English
 Marie of Blois, married in 1334 Rudolph, Duke of Lorraine (d. 1346), married secondly , Count of Leiningen-Dagsburg.

He took part in the expedition of Louis X of France against his uncle Robert III of Flanders in 1315, and in the early stages of the Hundred Years' War.

References

Sources

External links
 Counts of Blois

People of the Hundred Years' War
French soldiers
Guy I
1342 deaths
Year of birth unknown
Guy I